Mouhamadou Gueye (born July 6, 1998) is an American professional basketball player for the Texas Legends of the NBA G League. He played college basketball for the Monroe Mustangs, Stony Brook Seawolves and Pittsburgh Panthers.

Early life
Gueye was born in Staten Island, New York, to Senegalese parents who played basketball. His father, Ababacar, moved to Staten Island from Senegal in 1987 with $100 and saved money from a job in construction so that his wife, Souwadou, could join him a few years later. Gueye shared a passion for basketball with his father who would watch cassette tape games of their hometown New York Knicks and Ababacar's favourite player Michael Jordan. He played with friends at local parks and recreation centres in addition to his father paying for him to work with a trainer.

High school career
Gueye attended Curtis High School in Staten Island and started as a  guard before he grew  over four years. He did not play on the school's basketball team during his junior or senior seasons due to disciplinary measures arising from his truancy. 

Gueye was invited to play for a local Amateur Athletic Union (AAU) team, iWork Basketball, during his senior year. A teammate uploaded a highlight reel of Gueye's play to YouTube which was noticed by an assistant coach at Monroe College. Gueye was invited for a workout on campus and was offered a spot on the roster when the coaches saw his ball-handling and passing abilities.

College career
Gueye averaged 2.1 points and 3.6 rebounds per game during his freshman season at Monroe College. His playing ability increased during his sophomore season and attracted the interest of several colleges. Gueye transferred to the Stony Brook Seawolves where he learned how to play effectively within a system. He averaged 3.1 blocks per game during his second season with the Seawolves and was selected as the defensive player of the year in the America East Conference (AEC). Gueye was selected to the third-team All-AEC in 2021. He transferred to the Pittsburgh Panthers for his final season of college eligibility. He averaged 9.8 points, 6.3 rebounds and 1.1 assists per game during the 2021–22 season with the Panthers.

Professional career

Texas Legends (2022–present)
On September 21, 2022, Gueye signed with the Dallas Mavericks of the National Basketball Association (NBA). He was waived by the Mavericks on October 12, 2022. On October 23, 2022, Gueye was listed on the training camp roster of the Mavericks' NBA G League affiliate team, Texas Legends. On November 3, 2022, Gueye was named to the opening night roster for the Texas Legends.

References

External links
College statistics
Pittsburgh Panthers bio
Stony Brook Seawolves bio

1998 births
Living people
American men's basketball players
American people of Senegalese descent
Basketball players from New York City
Curtis High School alumni
Forwards (basketball)
Monroe Mustangs men's basketball players
Pittsburgh Panthers men's basketball players
Stony Brook Seawolves men's basketball players
People from Staten Island